Sargocentron vexillarium is a species of fish in the family Holocentridae

References

External links
 
 

vexillarium